The PSLV-C54  is the 56th mission of the Indian Space Research Organisation's Polar Satellite Launch Vehicle (PSLV). It was launched on 26 November 2022 with the EOS-06 satellite and Thybolt nanosatellites of Dhruva Space from Satish Dhawan Space Centre, Sriharikota, Andhra Pradesh, India.

Mission overview 
 Some Highlights:

Primary payload: EOS-06 (aka OceanSat-3) (1117 kg) satellite.

Secondary payloads: Eight ride-sharing small satellites.

Mission duration: 125 min. 21.36 sec. (last s/c separation)

Target Orbit 1 : 738 km (SSPO), Inclination = 98.34°

Target Orbit 2 : 511 km (SSPO), Inclination = 97.45°

Two Orbit Change Thrusters (OCT) introduced in the Propulsion Bay Ring.

Launch Azimuth: 140°

PSLV configuration : XL

56th flight of PSLV

24th Flight of PSLV XL

 Propellant:
 Stage 1: Composite Solid
 Stage 2: Earth Storable Liquid
 Stage 3: Composite Solid
 Stage 4: Earth Storable Liquid

The PSLV C54 rocket has four stages; each one was self-contained, with its own propulsion system, thereby capable of functioning independently. The first and third stages used composite solid propellants, while the second and fourth stage use earth-storable liquid propellant.

Launch 
The PSLV-C54 was successfully launched on 26 November 2022 at 11:56 IST / 06:12 UTC.

References 

Polar Satellite Launch Vehicle
Spacecraft launched by India in 2022
November 2022 events in India
Rocket launches in 2022